Secrets of the City (German: Die Stadt ist voller Geheimnisse) is a 1955 West German drama film directed by Fritz Kortner and starring Annemarie Düringer, Erich Schellow and Walther Süssenguth.

It was shot at the Wandsbek Studios in Hamburg. The film's sets were designed by the art directors Dieter Bartels and Herbert Kirchhoff.

Cast
 Annemarie Düringer as Annie Lauer 
 Erich Schellow as Rudolf Thomas, Engineer 
 Walther Süssenguth as Böhnke 
 Margot Trooger as Paula 
 Paul Hörbiger as Herbert Klein 
 Eva Ingeborg Scholz as Christl Lauer, Telephone Operator 
 Bruni Löbel as Susi Ecker 
 Adrian Hoven as Gerhard Scholz 
 Grethe Weiser as Frieda Binder 
 Karl Ludwig Diehl as Prof. Siebrecht 
 Lucie Mannheim as Karina 
 Werner Fuetterer as Dr. Gunther 
 Carl-Heinz Schroth
 Charles Regnier as Morton 
 Wilfried Seyferth as Ein Fremder 
 Georg Thomalla as Paul Martinek 
 Rudolf Vogel as Barkeeper

References

Bibliography
 Bock, Hans-Michael & Bergfelder, Tim. The Concise CineGraph. Encyclopedia of German Cinema. Berghahn Books, 2009.

External links 
 

1955 films
1955 drama films
German drama films
West German films
1950s German-language films
Films directed by Fritz Kortner
German black-and-white films
Films shot at Wandsbek Studios
Real Film films
1950s German films